A computing platform or digital platform is an environment in which a piece of software is executed. It may be the hardware or the operating system (OS), even a web browser and associated application programming interfaces, or other underlying software, as long as the program code is executed with it. Computing platforms have different abstraction levels, including a computer architecture, an OS, or runtime libraries. A computing platform is the stage on which computer programs can run.

A platform can be seen both as a constraint on the software development process, in that different platforms provide different functionality and restrictions; and as an assistant to the development process, in that they provide low-level functionality ready-made.  For example, an OS may be a platform that abstracts the underlying differences in hardware and provides a generic command for saving files or accessing the network.

Components
Platforms may also include:

 Hardware alone, in the case of small embedded systems. Embedded systems can access hardware directly, without an OS; this is referred to as running on "bare metal".
 A browser in the case of web-based software. The browser itself runs on a hardware+OS platform, but this is not relevant to software running within the browser.
 An application, such as a spreadsheet or word processor, which hosts software written in an application-specific scripting language, such as an Excel macro. This can be extended to writing fully-fledged applications with the Microsoft Office suite as a platform.
 Software frameworks that provide ready-made functionality.
 Cloud computing and Platform as a Service. Extending the idea of a software framework, these allow application developers to build software out of components that are hosted not by the developer, but by the provider, with internet communication linking them together. The social networking sites Twitter and Facebook are also considered development platforms.
 A virtual machine (VM) such as the Java virtual machine or .NET CLR. Applications are compiled into a format similar to machine code, known as bytecode, which is then executed by the VM.
 A virtualized version of a complete system, including virtualized hardware, OS, software, and storage. These allow, for instance, a typical Windows program to run on what is physically a Mac.

Some architectures have multiple layers, with each layer acting as a platform to the one above it. In general, a component only has to be adapted to the layer immediately beneath it. For instance, a Java program has to be written to use the Java virtual machine (JVM) and associated libraries as a platform but does not have to be adapted to run for the Windows, Linux or Macintosh OS platforms. However, the JVM, the layer beneath the application, does have to be built separately for each OS.

Operating system examples

Desktop, laptop, server

 AmigaOS, AmigaOS 4
 ChromeOS
 Unix and Unix-like
 Linux
 EulerOS
 FreeBSD, NetBSD, OpenBSD
 macOS
 IBM AIX
 HP-UX
 Solaris and illumos
 Tru64 UNIX
 IBM i
 Microsoft Windows
 OpenVMS
 Classic Mac OS - discontinued in 2011
 OS/2
 QNX
 Midrange computers with their custom operating systems
 Mainframe computers with their custom operating systems
 VM
 z/OS

Mobile

 Android
 Bada - discontinued in 2013
 BlackBerry OS - discontinued in 2013
 BlackBerry 10 - discontinued in 2022
 Embedded Linux
 Fire OS
 Firefox OS - discontinued in 2016
 HarmonyOS on Huawei smartphones models and Huawei MatePad tablets
 iOS
 iPadOS
 kaiOS
 LuneOS
 Newton OS on Newton devices from Apple
 Palm OS - discontinued in 2011
 Symbian - discontinued in 2012
 Sailfish OS
 Tizen
 Ubuntu Touch
 WebOS
 Windows Mobile - discontinued in 2010
 Windows Phone - discontinued in 2017

Software examples
 Shockwave
 Binary Runtime Environment for Wireless (BREW)
 Cocoa
 Cocoa Touch
 .NET
 Mono
 .NET Framework
 Silverlight
 Flash
 AIR
 GNU
 Java
 Java ME
 Java SE
 Java EE
 JavaFX
 JavaFX Mobile
 LiveCode
 Microsoft XNA
 Mozilla Prism, XUL and XULRunner
 Mozilla WebExtensions API is modeled after Google Chrome's API. Thus Firefox extensions are now largely compatible with their Chrome counterparts.
 Web platform
 Oracle Database
 Qt
 SAP NetWeaver
 Smartface
 Universal Windows Platform
 Windows Runtime
 HMS Core
 Cangjie

Hardware examples

 ARM architecture based devices
 Raspberry Pi or Gumstix full function miniature computers
 ARM servers with Unix-like systems such as Linux or BSD variants
ChromeBooks from various manufacturers
 IBM PC compatible systems
 IBM System p and IBM Power Systems computers
 IBM z/Architecture mainframes
 CP/M computers based on the S-100 bus, maybe the earliest microcomputer platform
 Video game consoles, any variety (PlayStation, Xbox, Nintendo)
 3DO Interactive Multiplayer, that was licensed to manufacturers
 Apple Pippin, a multimedia player platform for video game console development
 Supercomputer architectures

See also

 Cross-platform software
 Hardware virtualization
 Third platform
 Platform ecosystem

References

External links

Ryan Sarver: What is a platform?